The Franklin Lakes Public Schools are a community public school district serving students in pre-kindergarten through eighth grade from Franklin Lakes, in Bergen County, New Jersey, United States.

As of the 2018–19 school year, the district, comprising four schools, had an enrollment of 1,121 students and 138.7 classroom teachers (on an FTE basis), for a student–teacher ratio of 8.1:1.

The district is classified by the New Jersey Department of Education as being in District Factor Group "I", the second-highest of eight groupings. District Factor Groups organize districts statewide to allow comparison by common socioeconomic characteristics of the local districts. From lowest socioeconomic status to highest, the categories are A, B, CD, DE, FG, GH, I and J.

Students in public school for ninth through twelfth grades attend the schools of the Ramapo Indian Hills Regional High School District, a regional district consisting of two four-year public high schools serving students from Franklin Lakes, Oakland and Wyckoff. Before enrolling, students have the option to choose to attend either of the district's high schools. Schools in the high school district (with 2018–19 enrollment data from the National Center for Education Statistics) available to students from Franklin Lakes are
Indian Hills High School, located in Oakland (1,062 students) and
Ramapo High School, located in Franklin Lakes (1,222 students).

Awards and recognition
For the 2005-06 school year, the district was recognized with the "Best Practices Award" by the New Jersey Department of Education for its "Artist Historians" Social Studies program at Franklin Avenue Middle School.

Schools 
Schools in the district (with 2018–19 enrollment data from the National Center for Education Statistics) are:
Elementary schools
Colonial Road School with 245 students in grades K-5
Christine Gagliardo, Principal
High Mountain Road School with 218 students in grades PreK-5
Jaclyn Bajzath, Principal
Woodside Avenue School with 254 students in grades K-5
Ann Jameson, Principal
Middle school
Franklin Avenue Middle School with 418 students in grades 6-8
Joseph Keiser, Principal

Administration 
Core members of the district's administration are:
Gregorio Maceri, Superintendent
Michael J. Solokas, Business Administrator / Board Secretary

Board of education
The district's board of education, with nine members, sets policy and oversees the fiscal and educational operation of the district through its administration. As a Type II school district, the board's trustees are elected directly by voters to serve three-year terms of office on a staggered basis, with three seats up for election each year held (since 2012) as part of the November general election. The board appoints a superintendent to oversee the day-to-day operation of the district.

References

External links 
Franklin Lakes Public Schools
 
School Data for the Franklin Lakes Public Schools, National Center for Education Statistics
Ramapo Indian Hills Regional High School District website
Franklin Lakes Education Association

Franklin Lakes, New Jersey
New Jersey District Factor Group I
School districts in Bergen County, New Jersey